City of London Group plc is a United Kingdom-based investment company. The company was listed on the FTSE Fledgling Index of the London Stock Exchange under the ticker CIN in the financial services sector. Following a vote at its AGM in January 2023 the decision was made to delist the business. The company focuses on specialist financing and alternative fund management.

References

External links 
Official website

Companies listed on the London Stock Exchange
Financial services companies based in London